Hille Darjes (1944, Quelkhorn – 23 December 2018, Worpswede) was a German actress and radio play speaker.

Live 
Hille Darjes received a theatrical education in Hamburg at the "Hochschule for music and theatre". In 1984, she founded together with some colleagues the "Bremer Shakespeare Company". In 1992 she left the company and worked as a free actress in theatre and on the radio and held readings.

Plays and performances 

 The Tragedy of King Lear
 Twelfth Night
 Othello
 The invention of the freedom

Radio plays

Broadcasting company 

 In Donna Leon to fiction (as Paola Brunetti): 
 Death at La Fenice, 
 Death in a Strange Country, 
 The Anonymous Venetian, 
 Acqua Alta, 
 A Venetian Reckoning,
 The Death of Faith

Sound carrier (choice) 

Ruhelos, Schwäbisch Hall, Steinbach Sprechende Bücher, in 2009 
Emilia Galotti, Berlin: Argon publishing company in 2007 
Der Hofmeister oder Vorteile der Privaterziehung, Argon-Verlag, in 2007 
A Long Way Down, Munich: Der Hörverlag, in 2005 
Acqua alta, Munich: Der Hörverlag, in 2004 
Venezianische Scharade, Munich: Der Hörverlag, in 2004

References

External links 
 short biography and photo
 

German stage actresses
1944 births
2018 deaths
German radio actresses